Emmanuelle Cosse (born 15 November 1974) is a French activist with LGBT and feminist groups, and a politician with the green party Europe Ecology – The Greens, as well as a journalist and magazine editor.

Biography 

The successor to Philippe Mangeot, from 1999 to 2001 she was president of ACT UP-Paris, the local chapter of international LGBT rights and HIV/AIDS direct action group ACT UP. She was Co-Editor in Chief of the high-profile magazine , after having worked for several newspapers.

Political career 
She ran as a candidate with the party Europe Écologie (now Europe Écologie – Les Verts) during the 2010 French regional elections, in Île-de-France, which includes the city of Paris. She is currently Vice-President of the Regional Council of Île-de-France, administering the housing portfolio, since 26 March 2010. On 30 November 2013, she is elected National Secretary (in French secrétaire nationale) of Europe Écologie – Les Verts (EELV).

On 11 February 2016, she was appointed to French President François Hollande's cabinet as Minister for Housing and Sustainable Habitat. She resigned from her position as National Secretary of Europe Ecology – Les Verts on the same day.

References 

1974 births
Living people
French feminists
Europe Ecology – The Greens politicians
French LGBT rights activists
21st-century French women politicians
Women government ministers of France
Women civil rights activists
French Ministers of Housing